Apollo e Dafne (Apollo and Daphne, HWV 122) is a secular cantata composed by George Frideric Handel in 1709–10. Handel began composing the work in Venice in 1709 and completed it in Hanover after arriving in 1710 to take up his appointment as Kapellmeister to the Elector, the later King George I of Great Britain. The work is one of Handel's most ambitious cantatas and is indicative of the brilliant operatic career to follow in the next 30 years of his life.

The work's overture has not survived and therefore another of the composer's instrumental works is sometimes performed as an introduction. The cantata's instrumentation is bright, as Handel adds a flute, a pair of oboes and a bassoon to the usual strings.

The work takes just over 40 minutes to perform.

Synopsis

Apollo, having released Greece from tyranny by killing the menacing dragon Python, is in an arrogant mood. He boasts that even Cupid’s archery is no match for his own bow and arrow. When he sees the lovely Daphne his conceit is shattered. He is instantly smitten and deploys all his charms to win her favour. Naturally distrustful, she rejects his advances and declares that she would rather die than lose her honour. Apollo becomes more forceful in insisting that she yield to his love and takes hold of her. When all seems lost, Daphne manages to escape from his grasp by transforming herself into a laurel tree. Overwhelmed by sorrow, Apollo pledges that his tears will water her green leaves and that her triumphant branches will be used to crown the greatest heroes.

Dramatis personae
 Apollo (bass)
 Daphne (soprano)

Summary

External links

Cantatas by George Frideric Handel
1710 compositions
Music based on Metamorphoses